The 1950 United States Senate election in Connecticut was held on November 7, 1950.

Incumbent Democratic Senator Brien McMahon was re-elected to a second term in office over Republican former U.S. Representative Joseph E. Talbot.

General election

Candidates
Anthony R. Martino (Socialist)
Brien McMahon, incumbent Senator since 1945 (Democratic)
Joseph E. Talbot, former U.S. Representative from Naugatuck and State Treasurer (Republican)

Results

See also 
 1950 United States Senate elections

References 

1950
Connecticut
United States Senate